is a Japanese storyboard artist, screenwriter, and director. He has collaborated with famed director Junichi Sato in series such as Aria, Kaleido Star, and Prétear.

Anime involved in
Excel Saga: Episode Director (7, 12, 17, 22, 25)
Vandread: Episode Director (5)
Prétear: Episode Director (4, 8)
Vandread: The Second Stage: Storyboard (ep 6), Episode Director (1, 6, 8, 11), Assistant Director
Saikano: Storyboard (ep 7), Episode Director (2, 7)
Kaleido Star: Director (Season 2), Assistant Director
SoltyRei: Director, Storyboard (ep 1)
Aria The Natural: Storyboard (ep 15, 22), Episode Director (15, 22)
Sketchbook ~full color'S~: Director, Storyboard (ep 1, 6), Episode Director (13)
Working!!: Director, Series Composition, Storyboard (ep 1, 2)
Amagami SS: Director, Series Composition, Storyboard (1, 13), Episode Director (26)
AKB0048: Director, Storyboard (ep 1, 2, 5, 9)
AKB0048 next stage: Director, Storyboard (ep 4, 12)
Tokyo Ravens: Storyboard (ep 6)
Gugure! Kokkuri-san: Director, Script, Storyboard (ep 1)
Momokuri: Director, Series Composition
Nyanko Days: Director, Series Composition
Wotakoi: Love Is Hard for Otaku: Director, Series Composition
Black Summoner: Director, Series Composition

References

External links

Anime directors
Living people
Year of birth missing (living people)